Tikvah Chadasha (Shenfield and Brentwood Synagogue), whose Hebrew name means New Hope,  is a Jewish community in Essex, England. It was founded in 2010. Formerly a constituent community of Liberal Judaism (UK), it became a member of  the Movement for Reform Judaism in June 2021.

References

External links
 Official website

2010 establishments in England
Brentwood (Essex town)
Reform synagogues in the United Kingdom
Religion in Essex